Oshmyanka is a rural locality (a village) in Orlovsky Selsoviet, Blagoveshchensky District, Bashkortostan, Russia. The population was 252 as of 2010. There are 3 streets.

Geography 
Oshmyanka is located 20 km north of Blagoveshchensk (the district's administrative centre) by road. Truzhenik is the nearest rural locality.

References 

Rural localities in Blagoveshchensky District